The pygmy shore eel (Alabes parvula) is a species of clingfish from the family Gobiesocidae. This species was described as Cheilobranchus parvulus by Allan Riverstone McCulloch in 1909 from a type locality of rockpools near Sydney.

References

Fish described in 1909
Pygmy shore eel